Hyposmocoma hemicasis is a species of moth of the family Cosmopterigidae. It was first described by Edward Meyrick in 1935. It is endemic to the Hawaiian island of Oahu. The type locality is Mount Kaʻala.

External links

hemicasis
Endemic moths of Hawaii
Moths described in 1935
Taxa named by Edward Meyrick